C.D. Los Andes is a Salvadoran professional soccer team based in San Jorge, San Miguel, El Salvador. They currently play in the Tercera Division de Fútbol Salvadoreño.

Honours

Domestic honours

Leagues
 Primera División Salvadorean and predecessors 
 Champions : N/A
 Segunda División Salvadorean and predecessors 
 Champions (1) : N/A
 Runners-up (2): 
 Tercera División Salvadorean and predecessors 
 Champions (2) : 1981-82, 2005-06
 Play-off winner (2):

References

 El Salvador - Club Soccer

Football clubs in El Salvador